Kostroma rail bridge is a railway bridge across the Volga River in the city of Kostroma, located at the section of Karimovo-Kostroma-Novaya of the Severnaya Railway network. The bridge has 7 spans. 1-4 spans are eqquiped with deck-trusses, while 5-7 spans - with through trusses.

History 
The need for bridge construction in Kostroma occurred in the late 19th century due to the completion of the railway line Nerekhta - Kostroma in 1887. As far back as 1907 the city inhabitants already addressed a petition to Tsar Nicholas II. Years later, in December 1927, the Kostroma people requested again to the country's main leaders for building a railway bridge.

In 1929, the first caisson was installed. And already in 1932, the bridge construction was completed. The estimated cost was more than 8 million rubles. 2000 people were involved in the construction process. The span structures of the bridge were manufactured at Dniepropetrovsk Steelwork Plant of the Stalmost Trust (now OJSC "Dnepropetrovsk Steelwork Plant" named after I.V.Babuskin).

Boat traffic 
The bridge has two navigable spans: fifth from the right bank (its width is ) for vessels and rafts that go down the river, and sixth ( wide) for vessels that go up the river.

See also
Nikolai Belelubsky
Lavr Proskouriakov
Northern Railway (Russia)

Sources 
 The State Archive of Modern History of Kostroma region (PG 'GANIKO "), p. 3615, op. 3, d.797, l. 1.
 "Severnaya Pravda". March 1, 1932

External links 
 Вехи. Имена. События Костромы и костромичей 
 The history of JSC "Dniepropetrovsk Steelwork Plant them. IV Babushkin." 

Railway bridges in Russia
Kostroma
Bridges across the Volga River